Jhonathan Jose Bravo (born December 5, 1985 in Lima) is a Peruvian retired footballer.

Career

College and amateur
Bravo grew up in Sylmar, California, and played college soccer at Los Angeles Mission College from 2005 to 2007, where he was named to the Western State Conference All-Conference First Team as a freshman. He also played briefly with the San Fernando Valley Quakes in the USL Premier Development League in 2007 and 2008.

Professional
After playing and coaching for several years in various Los Angeles-area amateur leagues, Bravo turned professional when he signed with the expansion Los Angeles Blues of the new USL Professional League in February 2010. He made his professional debut on April 15, 2011 in a 3–0 victory over Sevilla Puerto Rico, and scored his first professional goal on May 20 in a 1–1 tie with the Dayton Dutch Lions.

Personal
Jhonny's brother, Gerardo Bravo, is also a professional soccer player.

References

1985 births
Living people
Footballers from Lima
Association football midfielders
Peruvian footballers
San Fernando Valley Quakes players
Orange County SC players
USL League Two players
USL Championship players
People from Sylmar, Los Angeles